is a Japanese former professional footballer who played as a defender.

Club career
Aoki was born in Takatsuki on 19 August 1984. After graduating from high school, he joined his local club Gamba Osaka in 2003. However he could hardly play in the match. He moved to JEF United Chiba in 2008. Although he became a regular player, the club was relegated to J2 League end of 2009 season. His opportunity to play decreased from 2012 and he moved to Roasso Kumamoto in August 2013. He moved to Thespakusatsu Gunma in 2014. His opportunity to play decreased in 2016 and retired end of 2016 season.

National team career
In September 2001, Aoki was selected Japan U-17 national team for 2001 U-17 World Championship. He played full-time in all 3 matches.

Club statistics

References

External links

1984 births
Living people
Association football people from Osaka Prefecture
People from Takatsuki, Osaka
Japanese footballers
Japan youth international footballers
J1 League players
J2 League players
Gamba Osaka players
JEF United Chiba players
Roasso Kumamoto players
Thespakusatsu Gunma players
Association football defenders